Velito Cruz (born 5 January 1991) is an Indian professional footballer who plays as a midfielder for Dempo in the I-League 2nd Division.

Career

Sporting Goa
Cruz made his professional debut for Sporting Goa in the I-League on 2 November 2013 against Pune at the Duler Stadium in which he came on as a substitute for Victorino Fernandes in the 78th minute; as Sporting Goa won the match 2–0.

Career statistics

References

External links 
 Goal Profile.

1991 births
Living people
Indian footballers
Sporting Clube de Goa players
Footballers from Goa
I-League players
Association football midfielders